Narla Venkateshwara Rao or V. R. Narla (1 December 1908 – 13 March 1985) was a Telugu language writer, journalist and politician from Andhra Pradesh in India. He was Rajya Sabha member twice from 3 April 1958 to 2 April 1970, and wrote a satakam in Telugu along with several other books.

Early life
Born in a middle class agricultural family, with limited means, Narla had to struggle hard in the early years of his illustrious life to achieve his ambition of social mobility upwards. His ancestors migrated from the Andhra area of former Madras Presidency to central India in what is now Madhya Pradesh and settled in Katni. They were contractors for the supply of foodgrains to the army. Later Narla returned to Andhra and resumed his studies to become a graduate. The raging national movement for independence inspired him and made him plunge into it. He is the brother of Narla Tata Rao, Engineer and Padma Shri recipient.

Career
There are two phases in Narla's life.

Journalism

The first part is preoccupation with journalism, blossoming out of his childhood flair for writing. It did not take long for him to earn recognition as a force to be reckoned with in Telugu journalism. His influence as an opinion maker arising out of the impact of his writings was tremendous. He was then editor of Andhra Prabha, the Telugu publication of Ramnath Goenka's Indian Express Group of newspapers. During Second World War as well as in the post- independence period, the readers of the paper would first savour his opinions on various matters before turning to the news columns. The daily newspaper published from Madras (today's Chennai) had such a stature that it lifted the status of Telugu journalism.

Narla introduced to Telugu readers Suryadevara Sanjiv Dev (of Tummapudi village in Guntur district) by serialising his memoirs in the newspaper to the delight of art lovers. Narla was a relentless fighter against injustice in society and politics. He faced the wrath of the chief ministers of Andhra Pradesh including Tanguturi Prakasam, Neelam Sanjiva Reddy, Kasu Brahmananda Reddy and P.V. Narasimharao on many occasions. Brahmananda Reddy wanted to check Andhra Jyothi daily during 1969 by introducing a bill in State Assembly to curb the freedom of the press. Journalists fought back and won against the Chief Minister. He had to withdraw the bill. Narla stood firm in the vanguard of the struggle.

Overseas

The second phase of his life opened with extensive overseas visits, covering several countries. During these travels, he devoted as much attention to the art and literature as well as to current affairs. From famous libraries, to monuments, art galleries, every aspect of life in the countries that he visited attracted his attention. Meanwhile, he left Andhra Prabha and launched another Telugu daily Andhra Jyothi with the help of friends, including industrialists, zamindars, politicians et al. Soon the Andhra Jyothy started an edition from Vijayawada, its first foray into Andhra Pradesh. During the late 1960s Narla shifted to Hyderabad which became the main publishing centre of the daily. The Chennai establishment was wound up

Change

By then Narla had changed a lot, both mentally and physically. A chain smoker, he stopped smoking after a heart attack. He organised his library, which had 25,000 books, both English and Telugu. The Library has since been given to the Ambdkar Open University in Hyderabad. The deep humanist strain in him developed and he emerged as a rationalist. He studied the Bhagavad Gita, the Upanishads and other Hindu spiritual works as well as the writings of M.N.Roy. In the process, he developed friendship with the Kashmiri leader, Prem Nath Bazaz, who was banished from Jammu and Kashmir by the administration of Sheikh Mohammad Abdullah. Bazaz was a friend and follower of M.N. Roy) Sushil Mukerjee (Minerva Associates, Kolkata, Radical Humanist), Niranjan Dhar (author of a controversial book on Vedanta in which he charged Swami Vivekananda the seer with shallowness), Justice V.M. Tarkunde (who resigned as a judge of the Bombay High Court and a renowned human rights activist, Professor A.B. Shah, founder of Indian Secular Society), Avula Gopalakrishna Murthy (advocate and leader of humanist movement in Andhra Pradesh and editor of humanist journals in Telugu).

M.N. Roy
Narla studied the works of M.N. Roy scrutinising his ideas. Roy was then critical of Gandhi and his leadership of the Indian National Congress. He suggested alternative methods of reforming the Congress party. He also criticised Gandhi's religious approach to politics. Roy had just then returned to India after 15 years' sojourn in Russia, Germany and China. Soon after he was arrested and detained for six years in the 1930s in connection with the Meerut Conspiracy Case. He was then a relative stranger to most Indian journalists.

When Roy addressed a press conference in Madras 1938 July, Khasa Subbarao, editor of Indian Express wrote sarcastically of Ellen, Roy's wife. That made Roy furious and he castigated Subbarao with harsh words. The journalists including Narla could not take it and boycotted Roy's press conference. From then onwards no news of Roy appeared in the Andhra Prabha as long as Narla remained its editor.

The entire nation paid tributes to M.N.Roy after his death on 25 January 1954, but the Andhra Prabha did not editorially pay homage to him. When AGK Murthy's critical comment on it at a public meeting at Guntur was reported to Narla, he lost no time in obtaining as many books on Roy as possible from Guttikonda Narahari, secretary of the Radical Democratic Party of Andhra Pradesh and set out to study them. Roy had run the party from 1942 to 1948, until he moved towards the Radical Humanist Movement.

The next year (1956) Narla wrote an editorial on Roy. As he began to study Roy's writings he started immensely liking his ideas. That also led to close friendship between A.G.K. Murthy and Narla. Narla disproved the popular belief that as age advances, cynicism and pessimism set in and that people start believing in karma, fate, the supernatural and the like and fall prey to all sorts of superstitions. On the other hand, his writings at that time were brimming with life, hope, optimism and above all humanism. Narla had meticulously maintained a diary, with copious notes on events, personalities and his thoughts.

The secret of Narla's fascination for M.N. Roy was his advocacy of human values, ethical norms, co-operative economy, decentralisation of the political structure with power being spread out, renaissance, critical outlook towards life, scientific approach in understanding every aspect of nature, purging history of myths and parables, secularism keeping the State and religion apart, so that religion remains a matter of personal faith and not the basis of administration. Roy gave utmost importance to the value of FREEDOM. Narla wanted these positive aspects to be adopted by modern India so that it can discard superstitions and blind beliefs.

Libraries

He had an indefatigable urge to visit libraries to spot books he might not have read earlier. Similarly, he would haunt second-hand bookstalls in search for the rare books. In the process, he was an up-to-date researcher on his favourite topics. He wrote monographs on Kandukuri Veeresalingam (Brahmo Samajist and famous social reformer of Andhra Pradesh), Gurjada Appa Rao whose prose drama Kanyasulkam, meaning sale of brides, demolished the practice of child marriages and sale of young girls as brides to aged persons and Vemana, a Telugu sage whose simple poems dispelled blind beliefs. Thanks to his practice of thoroughly researching his subjects before undertaking his writings; he (Narla) produced excellent books.

It was a delight for book lovers, art critics and others to visit Narla's residence for serious discussions and to savour his vast library. Manikonda Chalapathi Rao, the eminent editor of the National Herald was a frequent visitor to Narla's residence.  Gutala Krishna Murthy (publisher of Sri Sri Audio in London) was another close friend of Narla and stayed with him whenever he visited Hyderabad. Narla also had a flair for collecting Buddhist sculptures from various countries for serious study of their characteristics.

Study

Narla's forte was deep study of subjects he took up, whether history, philosophy or theology as well as Indian culture. He read the original texts comparing them with their western counterparts. On the Bhagavadgita or the Gita as it is popularly called, for instance, he collected different editions, including commentaries by various authors. He studied the Gita from different perspectives since it is regarded as the quintessence of Hindu philosophy with an undying impact on India. Similarly he studied the texts of the Upanishads, their interpretations, and different versions. He included in his intellectual sweep, foreign experts like Max Mueller, Schoephenhour, Nietzsche etc. Narla's broad approach to the understanding of Indian culture was both positive and negative. He published his observations in several volumes. The books include The Truth about the Gita, An essay on Upanishads, the Poverty of Intellectualism in India (Mysore University Lectures), The East West-dichotomy. Narla also brought out his stray thoughts in two volumes, Gods Goblins and Men: Man and his universe.

Narla also stood against injustice to scholars as well. A thesis of a Telugu scholar G.V. Krishnarao, entitled Studies of aesthetics in KALAPOORNODAYAM (in English) – was held up by the University of Madras . The examiners from Andhra were said to be prejudiced against him and therefore holding up the acceptance of the thesis. The caste factor also played a part in it. Krishnarao was a critic of Marxism and a well -known writer. Unable to find fault with the content and reasoning of the thesis, the examiners were on a fishing expedition to spot loopholes in his language. Krishnarao was only a graduate but allowed to submit his thesis for a Ph.D. degree. Narla studied the matter thoroughly and pointed out howlers in the language of examiner's reports! He pointed them out in a strongly worded letter to the Vice- Chancellor, Dr. Govindarajulu Naidu. Apprising the vice-chancellor of the mischievous role of caste minded examiners, he said he would have to expose the case before the public if they sat on his thesis further. The examiners then reconsidered the case and recommended Krishnarao for the award of the degree. The Andhra Prabha later published several critical articles of Krishna Rao on Marxism and the Marxian approach to literature, the art and aesthetics/

Narla also studied the negative aspects of India both in the past and the present. He thought the ancient seer Yagnavalkya was a stumbling block to free thought because his ideas ruled out questioning and inquiry. He was an authoritarian. He wanted to thrust on the people the sacred texts with a dictatorial attitude. That was the root cause of India's backwardness in the past. In the modern days Mahatma Gandhi brought religion into politics to achieve independence. He depended upon his inner voice, which was unverifiable. His decision- making was often flawed. Gandhi encouraged law breaking to oppose British rule in India. His Satyagraha led to violence. His food fads also restricted healthy bodybuilding. Gandhi had no scientific outlook on any aspect of life. He depended on the Gita and everyday recited it at his prayer meetings. While admiring Gandhi's role in the freedom movement Narla opposed his religious approach to solving political and other problems. Narla pointed out the defects in Indian culture from divergent perspectives and appealed to the younger generation to discard belief in karma and rebirth which undermined vitality and sense of self-dependence. The fatalistic attitude of Hinduism particularly stood in the way of India's path towards renaissance, scientific revolution, and humanism. Hence Narla advocated adoption of humanistic values where humans rely on themselves for solving problems.

United States

As a conscientious journalist Narla was upset when the fundamental rights enshrined in the Constitution were suspended and 'internal emergency' imposed in 1975 by the then Prime Minister Indira Gandhi. He wanted to keep the editorial column of Andhra Jyothy ( of which he was editor) blank as a mark of protest. But the management did not allow it as the Government would come down on such a protest and even close down the newspaper under the draconian laws then in force.

To avoid the resultant confusion and uncertainty, Narla went to the US to be with his seven children and their families. All his seven children, sons and daughters, are medical doctors practising in the US. He returned to India after the 'emergency' ceased to be and then resigned as editor of Andhra Jyothy. This was not the first time that Narla resigned his job to assert his right as editor against interference in his work by the management. During the late 1940s he submitted his resignation as editor of Andhra Prabha while supporting the journalists who were resisting the efforts of the proprietor, Ramanath Goenka, to disperse the newspaper establishment from Madras to the districts to defeat Government regulations on pay scales of the staff. But ultimately, Goenka persuaded Narla not to press his resignation. Narla also developed contempt for the Congress Party for its demagogic attitude to public life. As a member of the Rajya Sabha he was witness at close quarters to the functioning of corrupt politicians. That further put him off from the goings on in public life.

Public speaking

Narla was more a thinker and writer than a speaker but that did not keep him away from public meetings, study camps, conferences, etc. where he would cogently and lucidly present his point of view. In his last days he actively participated in Radical Humanist, Rationalist and atheist meetings and participated in inter-caste functions. Narla's studies of the Gita, the Upanishads and the puranas (Hindu holy texts) were published posthumously. He also authored a Telugu play SEETHA JOSYAM (prophecy of Seetha) published by the Sahitya Academy. The play evinced much interest among religious and literary circles. However, Narla vehemently resented criticism of the play by the official journal of the Sahitya Academy, on the ground that being the mouthpiece of the publishers it should not voice criticism of the work. He also made it the ground for rejecting the Sahitya Academic award, which caused a sensation in the literary circles. Narla's monographs on Vemana, Veerasalingam and Gurajada Appa Rao were translated into several Indian languages. In his last days, Narla took up cudgels against Viswanatha Satyanarayana, on the ground that he promoted revivalism. He also disapproved of the writings of Gudipati Venkata Chalam a popular Telugu writer who grew into an advocate of free sex while promoting women's liberation.

Play writer

After giving up newspaper editorship Narla took to writing plays on serious themes with lengthy prefaces – on the lines of George Bernand Shaw's works. One such play Narakam lo Harischandra (Harischandra in Hell) with a long preface was dedicated  to his longtime friend and journalist Innaiah Narisetti. Harischandra was a famous votary of truth. He would rather lose his kingdom than speak a lie. He was therefore called Satya Harischandra. Another play of Narla also was based on the mythological story of Draupadi who was the common wife of the five Pandava princes. Narla could not complete his characteristic lengthy preface for the play, which was originally, titled it PANCHALI or wife of five persons. Paatha Kotha, (old and new) a collection of essays by Narla was selected as one of the best books in modern Telugu literature. It was also published posthumously by his family members through New Student Book House, Vijayawada. There is an incomplete essay on PURANA VAIRAGYAM. Finally, Narla was working on a project of one thousand verses in Telugu – Narla Maata (Narla's word). Each verse ended with the refrain, Navayugaala Baata Naarla Maata (the path of the new age and Narla's word) literally. These verses are pungent criticism of the society, dripping in satire and laying stress on human values.

Memoirs

Narla set out to recall his experiences, including encounters with several persons and his opinions on various matters, as a kind of memoirs. A few of the essays were published in the Andhra Prabha weekly but due to pressures from different sources the serialisation stopped. Narla was briefly associated with the founder of the Telugu Desam Party (TDP) as advisor to the chief minister N.T. RamaRao on cultural affairs.

Personal life
Narla married Sulochana in 1938. It was not only a happy and ideal marriage but he was also lucky in having a better half like her. She stood foursquare with him during trying times in his illustrious life. Of their eight children, the eldest daughter, Sarada, was married to Kolli Gangadhar Rao. Both the husband and wife are medical doctors located in Guntur. The third daughter Meenakshi married Dr. Sharad from Maharashtra. Narla felt happy at the marriage between persons of two different languages, inter-lingual marriages so common these days. They are settled down in Phoenix, USA. The second fourth and fifth are all daughters Chandrakala, Uma and Rama, respectively all doctors married to doctors and living in the US. Narla would often joke that except his wife and he the rest of the family were all doctors. Of course, he had been a conferred honorary doctorate by several universities but he never flaunted the degree with his name.

The Narlas's eldest son Mohan Das is a professor in cell biology working in New York city. The second son, Durga Das, and his younger brother, Lakshman Das, are also doctors living in the US. They wanted their parents to shift to the US but Narla would not have it. He preferred to live in India and be visiting his sons and daughters and their families in the US.

Donation
When Narla was alive he would not part with his library or precious art collections. There were several offers from universities and museums but he would not have it. After his death his wife, carefully preserving the books for some years ultimately presented the library to the Dr. B.R. Ambedkar Open University in Hyderabad. The university has an annual programme of memorial lectures on him.

Telugu writers
1908 births
1985 deaths
Recipients of the Sahitya Akademi Award in Telugu
20th-century Indian journalists
Rajya Sabha members from Andhra Pradesh
Journalists from Andhra Pradesh
Indian male journalists